= Michael Beckman =

English lawyer and QC (1932–2023)

Michael David Beckman KC (6 April 1932 – 7 October 2023) was a British lawyer.

== Biography ==
Born in London to a family of Polish descent, Beckman served in the Royal Army Service Corps before pursuing a law degree at King's College London. He was called to the Bar in 1954 and later became a Queen's Counsel in 1976.

Beckman's legal practice predominantly focused on criminal cases. His notable early work included participating in the Tibbs gang trial and getting an acquittal in the 1970 Parkhurst riot trial.

In 1975, Beckman established his own chambers in Lincoln's Inn, which grew to specialize in commercial, company, insolvency, and property law.
